Eriorhynchus is a genus in the family Eriorhynchidae

Species
 Eriorhynchus australicus Womersley, 1941 
 Eriorhynchus hades Qin & Halliday, 1997 
 Eriorhynchus ramosus Qin & Halliday, 1997 
 Eriorhynchus walteri Qin & Halliday, 1997 
 Eriorhynchus womersleyi Qin & Halliday, 1997

References

Animals described in 1997
Trombidiformes genera